Yue Yuen Industrial (Holdings) Limited is a Taiwanese footwear manufacturer headquartered in Hong Kong and established by its Taiwanese parent company, Pou Chen Group. It is the largest branded athletic and casual footwear manufacturer in the world. It is an original equipment manufacturer (OEM) and original design manufacturer (ODM) for major international brand name companies such as Nike, Crocs, Adidas, Reebok, Asics, New Balance, Puma, Timberland and Rockport.

It was one of the Hang Seng Index Constituent Stocks (bluechip) in the Hong Kong Stock Exchange. But after 8 June 2009, it was removed from blue chip.

In April 2014 40,000 workers were protesting the company's failure to pay the full social security and house renting contribution. The protests were triggered by a staff member who worked for 18 years at Yue Yuen did not get her full pension. The company did not pay 250 yuan per month to the employee that they should have. All companies are supposed under Chinese law to pay full mandatory social insurance for workers – including pensions, medical insurance, housing allowances and injury compensation.

References

External links 
Yue Yuen Industrial Holdings Limited website
Pou Chen Group website

Shoe companies of Taiwan
Pou Chen Group
Clothing companies established in 1991
1991 establishments in Taiwan
Companies listed on the Hong Kong Stock Exchange
Former companies in the Hang Seng Index